Bridson is a Manx surname. Notable people with the surname include:

 Annie Dorothy Bridson (1893–1985), Manx member of the House of Keys, and the first woman president of the Manx Labour Party
 D. G. Bridson (1910–1980), British BBC radio author and producer
Diane Mary Bridson (born 1942), British botanist, wife of Gavin
Gavin Bridson (1936-2008), British bibliographer and librarian, husband of Diane
 Gordon Bridson (1909–1972), New Zealand swimmer and naval commander
 John Bridson (1863–1898), Australian cricketer
 Martin Bridson (born 1964), Manx mathematician
 Norma Williams (née Bridson, 1928–2017), New Zealand swimmer, swimming administrator and author

See also 
 Thomas Bridson Cribb (1845–1913), Australian politician